The Indian Residential Schools Settlement Agreement (IRSSA;) is an agreement between the government of Canada and approximately 86,000 Indigenous peoples in Canada who at some point were enrolled as children in the Canadian Indian residential school system, a system which was in place between 1879 and 1997. The IRSSA recognized the damage inflicted by the residential schools and established a C$1.9-billion compensation package called CEP (Common Experience Payment) for all former IRS students. The agreement, announced in 2006, was the largest class action settlement in Canadian history. 

As of March 2016, a total of C$1,622,422,106 has been paid to 79,309 former students. An additional C$3.18 billion has been paid out to 31,103 former students as of March 31, 2019, through IAPs (Independent Assessment Process) which are for damages suffered beyond the norm for the IRS.

Indian residential schools

Indian residential schools were a network of "boarding schools" for Native Canadians (First Nations or "Indians"; Métis and Inuit). These schools operated in all Canadian provinces and territories except Prince Edward Island, New Brunswick, and Newfoundland and Labrador.

The first school opened in 1828, and the last one closed in 1997. The last school to close was Kivalliq Hall in Rankin Inlet, in what is now Nunavut; it became a IRSSA-recognized school in 2019 following a court ruling, which is why earlier accounts describe the last school closing in 1996.

Funded by the Canadian government's Indian Affairs and Northern Development, and administered by Christian churches, predominantly the Roman Catholic Church in Canada (60%), but also the Anglican Church of Canada (30%), and the United Church of Canada, including its pre-1925 constituent church predecessors (10%). The policy was to remove children from the influence of their families and culture and assimilate them into the dominant Canadian culture. Over the course of the system's existence, approximately 30% of native children, roughly some 150,000, were placed in residential schools nationally.

History of the IRSSA
In November 1996, the Royal Commission on Aboriginal Peoples (RCAP) issued its final 4,000-page report with 440 recommendations. Indian residential schools were the topic of one chapter. In 1998 in response to the RCAP the Canadian federal government unveiled Gathering Strength: Canada's Aboriginal Action Plan, a "long-term, broad-based policy approach in response to the Royal Commission on Aboriginal Peoples which included the "Statement of Reconciliation: Learning from the Past," in which the "Government of Canada recognizes and apologizes to those who experienced physical and sexual abuse at Indian residential schools and acknowledges its role in the development and administration of residential schools."

In 2001, the federal Office of Indian Residential Schools Resolution Canada was created to manage and resolve the large number of abuse claims filed by former students against the federal government.   In 2004, an Assembly of First Nations Report on Canada’s Dispute Resolution Plan to Compensate for Abuses in Indian Residential Schools led to discussions to develop a holistic, fair and lasting resolution of the legacy of Indian Residential Schools.

The law firm of Regina, Saskatchewan lawyer, Tony Merchant, Q.C.—Merchant Law Group LLP—represented over 7,000 survivors—approximately 50 per cent of "all known" residential school survivors in Canada" who had pursued class action lawsuits" against the Canadian federal government . Following the publication of the 1996 Royal Commission on Aboriginal Peoples report, residential school survivors met across the country at gatherings, also attended by Tony Merchant, who became a "familiar figure", signing up thousands of survivors for a class action law suit. MLG lawyers received "nothing until a class action settlement was secured" in a legal fees agreement that was settlement-driven. David Blott's Calgary, Alberta-based law firm "handled almost 4,600 residential school claims."

On November 20, 2005, an agreement in principle was reached by the negotiating parties which included Canada, as represented by Frank Iacobucci, a retired Supreme Court of Canada Justice, the plaintiffs' representative—the National Consortium and the Merchant Law Group (MLG), independent Counsel, the Assembly of First Nations, Inuit representatives, the General Synod of the Anglican Church of Canada, the Presbyterian Church in Canada, the United Church of Canada, and Roman Catholic Entities for the "resolution of the legacy of Indian Residential Schools."

On 23 November 2005 the Canadian federal government announced the IRSSA compensation package. It represents the largest class-action lawsuit in Canadian history. On 11 June 2008, Prime Minister Harper "apologized on behalf of the Government of Canada, and all Canadians, for the forcible removal of Aboriginal children from their homes and communities to attend Indian residential schools. In this historic Apology, the Prime Minister recognized that there is no room in Canada for the attitudes that created the residential school system to prevail."

In Regina, Saskatchewan, on December 15, 2006, Justice Dennis Ball, approved the "settlement of class and individual residential school claims" under the IRSSA.

Components of the IRSSA

The agreement was signed on May 8, 2006, with implementation on September 19, 2007.

Federal government contributions

The five main components of the IRSSA provided by the federal government were the Common Experience Payment (CEP), Independent Assessment Process (IAP), the Truth and Reconciliation Commission (TRC), Commemoration, and Health and Healing Services.

Common Experience Payment (CEP) 
The IRSSA offered former students blanket compensation through the Common Experience Payment (CEP) with an average lump-sum payment of C$28,000. The CEP, a component of the Indian Residential Schools Settlement Agreement, totaling C$1.9 billion, was "part of an overall holistic and comprehensive response to the Indian residential school legacy." Payments were higher for more serious cases of abuse. The CEP recognized "the experience of living at an Indian Residential School(s) and its impacts. All former students who resided at a recognized Indian Residential School(s) and were alive on May 30, 2005 were eligible for the CEP. This include[d] First Nations, Métis, and Inuit former students." This initial payment for each person who attended a residential school amounted to C$10,000 per person plus C$3,000 per year. The application deadline for CEP was 19 September 2011 with some exceptions made until September 19, 2012. By 31 December 2012, "a total of 105,540 applications were received under the common experience payment. C$1.62 billion was paid to "78,750 recipients, representing 98% of the 80,000 estimated eligible former students."

Independent Assessment Process
The IRSSA allotted C$960 million to the Independent Assessment Process (IAP), "a settlement fund for claims of sexual abuses, serious physical abuse and other wrongful acts" at IRS which "provides money to those who experienced serious physical and/or sexual abuse at an Indian Residential School (...) The maximum payment is C$275,000, but an additional C$250,000 may be awarded for claims of actual income loss." By 31 December 2012, over C$1.7 billion in total was issued through the IAP. around three times more applications were received than expected, and the IAP is forecast to continue hearings until around 2017. By 2011 there were already 29,000 claims, double the 12,500 originally estimated by the IRSSA and this number was expected to rise even more. Violent abuse was "rampant, not isolated." According to Dan Ish, Indian Residential School Adjudication Secretariat chief adjudicator for the IAP, estimated in 2012 that IAP claims would be somewhere between two and three billion dollars more than anticipated.

The fate of the records documenting over 38,000 IAP claims was placed in front of Canadian courts. The Supreme Court of Canada decided that on September 19, 2027 all records generated through IAP will be destroyed unless the Survivor mentioned in the record indicates that they wish the record is preserved. The Supreme Court decision indicated that IAP records can only be requested for preservation by Survivors. Family members are unable to ask for records to be saved, meaning that IAP records of people who have died since the time of their IAP claim and before this process was established, will not be saved.

Indian Residential Schools Truth and Reconciliation Commission

IRSSA allocated C$60 million for the Truth and Reconciliation Commission (TRC) to document and preserve the experiences of survivors. The Commission was launched  2 June 2008. On 20 October 2008, Justice Harry LaForme, Commission chair resigned, claiming "the commission was on the verge of paralysis and doomed to failure. He cited an "incurable problem" with the other two commissioners — Claudette Dumont-Smith and Jane Brewin Morley — who he said refused to accept his authority as chairman and were disrespectful." On 15 October 2009 the Indian Residential Schools Truth and Reconciliation Commission was relaunched by then-Governor General Michaëlle Jean with Justice Murray Sinclair, an Ojibway-Canadian judge, First Nations lawyer, as the chair. By August 2012, the federal government had released over 941,000 documents to the TRC related to residential schools.

Health and Healing Services
On 31 March 1998 in response to the RCAP and as part of Gathering Strength—Canada's Aboriginal Action Plan, the federal government established the Aboriginal Healing Foundation (AHF), an "Aboriginal-managed, national, Ottawa-based, not-for-profit private corporation", with a C$350 million-dollar grant and an eleven-year mandate from March 1998 to March 2009. Its role was "to encourage and support, through research and funding contributions, community-based Aboriginal directed healing initiatives which address the legacy of physical and sexual abuse suffered in Canada’s Indian Residential School System, including inter-generational impacts." In 2007, under the IRSSA, the federal government provided $125 million to the AHF, which was intended to provide five years of funding. Further funding was to come from the money paid by the Catholic entities under section 3.3 of Schedule O-3, of which at least 80% was to be transferred to the AHF. A court dispute over the amount of money due to the AHF because of this obligation subsequently arose between the government and the Catholic entities.

IRSSA also supported the Resolution Health Support Worker (RHSW) Program.

Commemoration Fund
The IRSSA allocated C$20 million for the Commemoration Fund for national and community commemorative projects. This fund was managed by the TRC and Aboriginal Affairs and Northern Development Canada.

Church contributions 

The church entities signed agreements to provide financial and in-kind support for healing and reconciliation programs, as outlined in the following table. Compensation payments made prior to the implementation of the IRSSA were credited against these obligations.

Legal representation
Crawford Class Action was the court-appointed administrator. C$100-million was allocated by IRSSA for the payment of plaintiffs’ legal fees.

Controversies

Conduct of certain lawyers 
Dan Ish, upon his retirement from his position as chief adjudicator of IAP, described challenges with private lawyers who allegedly illegally profited from IRSSA benefits. They investigated Winnipeg lawyer Howard Tennenhouse, Calgary lawyer David Blott and Vancouver lawyer Stephen Bronstein and numerous other lawyers. Ish "personally reported Tennenhouse to the Law Society of Manitoba, who eventually disbarred the veteran lawyer and repaid clients nearly a million dollars. A Vancouver judge barred Blott and others he worked with from further IAP work after claimants complained of wrongly being charged loans, fees, penalties and interest-something forbidden under the IAP. In 2013, the IRSAS requested an investigation into Bronstein but settled for a "review" of his practice and alleged connection with a paroled murderer doing IAP intake work." In 2012 the Law Society of Manitoba disbarred Tennenhouse for life. He pleaded guilty to charges and agreed to pay back the "C$950,000 in extra fees" he charged 55 former residential school students. In 2014 as the Law Society of Alberta moved to disbar Calgary lawyer, David Blott "accused of misconduct in his handling of settlements awarded to survivors of residential school abuse", Blott resigned. The "investigation into Blott’s action cost taxpayers C$3.5 million."  Ivon Johnny, a convicted killer, had his parole revoked in January 2013 after "allegations he threatened and extorted (...) substantial sums of money from vulnerable and in some cases cognitively deficient [IRSSA] claimants. In February 2013 "B.C. Supreme Court Justice Brenda Brown "ordered Bronstein to be interviewed by a court monitor about his alleged dealings with Johnny."

In January 2015, the office of the Attorney General of Canada launched a law suit in the Court of Queen's Bench for Saskatchewan, in Regina, Saskatchewan, on behalf of the Canadian federal government, against Tony Merchant's Regina, Saskatchewan-based Merchant Law Group. Tony Merchant, Q.C., who "is known as the king of class action lawsuits in Canada,"  and Merchant Law Group LLP had successfully represented about fifty per cent of "all known individuals in Canada pursuing class action lawsuits" against the Canadian federal government as survivors of residential schools. In November 2005, they were part of the negotiating teams that culminated in the multi-billion National Settlement with the Canadian Government−C$1.9 Billion in compensation for Common Experience Payments" and  C$3 billion in Independent Assessment Process (IAP) compensation. The 2015 case against MLG was first launched at the Queen's Court, and appealed at the Court of Appeal before it was heard by the Supreme Court of Canada in 2018.  The March 15, 2018 ruling by the Supreme Court of Canada rejected MLG's appeal to have the fraud action struck down, which means the government of Canada can continue with its damages suit against the law firm.

On August 2, 2018, the Supreme Court of Canada dismissed Merchant Law Group (MLG)'s appeal to retain C$21,310.83 of a residential school survivor’s compensation" for "outstanding legal bills." The survivor's January 2014 C$93,000 IRSSA Independent Assessment Process (IAP) compensation is protected under a 2006 Supreme Court of British Columbia the IRSSA and the Financial Administration Act. Under that Act, lawyers are "expressly forbidden to assign any part of IAP compensation"..."because IAP claimants were considered especially vulnerable." Since 2000, MLG had represented the client and her son. The adjudication secretariat routinely checking IAP files found the deduction for the previous legal bills."  When Merchant was told to return the money to the claimant,  he appealed to retain the money for legal fees. In October 2020, the Law Society of Saskatchewan announced their decision to suspend Merchant for eight months, saying that because of the woman's vulnerability, Merchant "should have known better" than to use a disrespectful, and intimidating tone with her, compelling her to sign a form authorizing Merchant to retain her IAP claim to pay for "unrelated legal bills owed by her son." The disciplinary panel said the suspension will start in February 2021 and that Merchant must also pay over C$10,000 in costs. According to an October 2, 2020 Regina Leader Post article, MLG submitted a statement of appeal to the Saskatchewan Court of Appeal to overturn the disciplinary panel's decision, and to overturn the suspension.

Legal dispute between Canadian Government and Catholic entities 
The IRSSA provided for a dispute resolution process using “requests for directions” (RFD). On December 24, 2013, the Government of Canada submitted an RFD (RFD #1) seeking directions on the extent to which the Catholic entities were allowed to deduct legal fees of C$1.6 million incurred to administer their financial obligations of C$29 million as “reasonable administration costs”.

The Catholic entities attempted to negotiate a settlement to resolve RFD #1. Through their lawyer, Gordon Kuski, they offered to “settle all matters between the parties” by paying C$1 million in exchange for “a General Release with respect to all matters between the Parties,” and “more specifically”, “a Release and an Indemnity in accordance with the terms contemplated by Section 4.5 and Section 4.6 of the Settlement Agreement, Schedule ‘O-3’”. In negotiations, the Catholic entities’ offer increased to C$1.2 million. 

On September 18, 2014 at 7:08 a.m., government lawyer Alexander Gay emailed Kuski: “The clients accept C$1.2M as a quantum. The thing that needs to be resolved is the paperwork and the wording on the release documents. How do you propose to proceed?” At 9:13 a.m., Kuski replied: “Thanks for this. We have a deal. I’ll call you today to discuss logistics.” Kuski followed up with a letter describing the settlement, including language about a release under §4.5 and §4.6. At 11:37 a.m., Gay replied by email:

At 4:02 p.m., Kuski sent a draft General Final Release, which was mostly consistent with his previous letter of June 26, but added a release under §4.7 (related to the fundraising obligations) as well.

On September 30, 2014, Gay sent Kuski an amended draft General Final Release that would release the Catholic Entities only from matters related to RFD #1. He did not redline Kuski’s draft or explicitly advise him of the significant difference between versions. Kuski replied on October 1 advocating for the broader release; Gay’s response included the sentence, “We may have a problem.” On November 10, Canada refused to consent to the broader release. The Catholic Entities commenced a second RFD (RFD #2) arguing that an enforceable settlement had been reached.

Evidence pertaining to the government's position on the fundraising obligation 
Some evidence related to RFD #1 from government affiant Pamela Stellick went beyond the issues in the RFD; in particular, she stated that the Catholic entities had “failed to meet their C$25M fundraising obligation”. Cross-examined on the government’s position, she said, “I think there is some concerns perhaps that more efforts couldn’t have been made to raise further funding from across Canada.” When asked what suggestions the government had for improving the campaign, she answered, “I don’t think it is Canada’s place to offer or suggest or tell them how to run their fundraising campaign.” During RFD #2, Gay expressed “some concern” about whether the Catholic entities had satisfied the fundraising obligation, but had “no knowledge” as to whether the government believed the Catholic entities were in default of that obligation.

Outcome of RFD #2: Fontaine v Saskatchewan (Attorney General) 
Justice Neil Gabrielson found that an enforceable settlement did exist: in exchange for C$1.2 million, the Catholic entities were entitled to releases and indemnities under §4.5 and §4.6 of the IRSSA, but not §4.7. He rejected Canada’s position that the parties had agreed only on the amount to pay, and would deal “with quantum first and terms second”:

Failure of Catholic fundraising campaign and related press coverage 
The Catholic fundraising campaign, called “Moving Forward Together”, fell far short of its $25 million goal, ultimately raising only $3.7 million. Since some of the financial obligations of the Anglican and United Churches under the IRSSA were proportional to the outcome of the Catholic campaign, the failure of the campaign reduced those obligations by more than $3 million. In April 2016, The Globe and Mail linked the fundraising shortfall to the legal dispute, claiming that a "miscommunication by a federal lawyer" had "allowed the Catholic Church to renege on its obligation to try to raise $25-million to pay for healing programs for the survivors of Indian residential schools."

Early press coverage: 2014 to early 2016 
In early 2014, The Catholic Register and the Nickel Belt News reported that the federal government was suing the Catholic entities over what the Nickel Belt News called "$1.5 million in contested expenses on funds." We’re supposed to exercise our best efforts. We could contend we have exercised our best efforts. Short of a miracle, I don’t think we’re going to be able to make it.” Pettipas told the Register that "[a]ll the elements of the settlement" were "supposed to conclude in September 2014", though "the work of the Truth and Reconciliation Commission" had been "extended another year to 2015."

In May 2014, the Anglican Journal reported on a presentation by Chancellor David Jones to the Anglican Council of General Synod on the status of Anglican IRSSA funds. He stated that "$2.7 million" of that money was "held in reserve pending the outcome of the Roman Catholic fundraising campaign", and could be returned to the Anglican entities unless "the Catholic campaign raised more than $11.1 million by September 2014".

In January 2016, The Catholic Register reported on the “failure” of the “Moving Forward Together” campaign, stating that the “$21-million shortfall” had “added another challenge to the task of reconciliation between Canadian churches and Native communities.” The article observed that “[w]ith the campaign over and the Aboriginal Healing Foundation wrapped up, the Catholic fundraising shortfall meant a reduction in the proportion owed by the other three churches.” In particular, "$2.8 million" had been returned to the Anglicans, who would use it for their “ongoing Anglican Fund for Healing and Reconciliation, which runs reconciliation projects in remote aboriginal communities across Canada.”

The Globe and Mail links fundraising shortfall to legal dispute 
On April 17, 2016, The Globe and Mail published an article claiming that "[i]n an attempt to make the Catholic Church pay the full amount of the $29-million cash settlement, the government inadvertently released it from any obligation it might have had to continue with a dismal fundraising campaign." The article quoted Andrew Saranchuk, an assistant deputy minister within the Indigenous Affairs department, as having written to a citizen that a court settlement reached on July 16, 2015 (i.e., Fontaine v Saskatchewan (Attorney General)), "released the Catholic entities from all three of their financial obligations under the settlement agreement, including the 'best efforts' fundraising campaign, in exchange for a repayment of $1.2-million in administrative fees." Saranchuk claimed that this result "was due to miscommunications between counsel regarding the nature and extent of the settlement being discussed." Describing the court decision, the article stated that during the 2014 settlement negotiations, "Mr. Gay's responses led Mr. Kuski to believe they had a deal, even though the government had no intention of allowing the Church to walk away from the fundraising obligations."

The Globe and Mail'''s claim that the 2015 court decision played a crucial role in ending the Catholic fundraising obligation was at variance with prior reporting from The Catholic Register and the Anglican Journal, which placed the end of the fundraising campaign in 2014. (A 2017 article from the Anglican Journal also stated that the "Roman Catholic campaign ended in September 2014".) According to section 3.9 of Schedule O-3 of the IRSSA, the Catholic entities agreed to "use their best efforts" to raise funds "throughout the seven year period following the day after the coming into force of this Agreement"; the agreement came into effect on September 19, 2007. In a February 2014 affidavit from the legal dispute, AANDC senior analyst Pamela Stellick deposed that the campaign was "to end in 2014".

In an April 18 Globe and Mail article, former AFN National Chief Phil Fontaine, who helped to negotiate the IRSSA and also assisted the Catholic entities with the fundraising campaign, was quoted as saying, "The government is ultimately responsible for meeting all of the financial obligations [...] I don't know about legally, but there's a moral obligation here [...] We're dealing with close to 80,000 survivors and it's important for them that they be treated fairly and justly." Describing his work with the fundraising campaign, he said, "We tried very hard to meet the commitment that the Catholic church entities faced. We were unsuccessful." Senator Murray Sinclair, who chaired the Truth and Reconciliation Commission, "pointed out that one of the commission's calls to action was for the parties to the settlement agreement – the churches and the government – to establish permanent funding for healing and reconciliation." The article quoted Sinclair as saying, "When two of the defendants make a deal between themselves that ends up in a loss of funding to the survivors, then who really suffers?" An April 19 article stated that Indigenous Affairs Minister Carolyn Bennett "said it is not up to the government to compensate for the shortfall", and further quoted Bennett as saying that the Catholic Church should pay and that the government would "apply deeper pressure" to that end.

An April 20 article reported that "[u]nder the former Conservative government, the Justice Department served notice in August that it intended to appeal the ruling." However, according to a government representative writing in April 2016, "officials from the Department of Aboriginal Affairs and Northern Development received a mandate from the former Conservative government to negotiate a settlement with the Catholic entities. [...] Negotiations began in August 2015 and an agreement of release was signed October 30, 2015. As a result of these negotiations, it was agreed the Protective Notice of Appeal would be withdrawn." The appeal was dropped "six days after the Trudeau government took office."

An April 26 article reported on the reduction of the financial obligations of the Anglican and United Churches due to the failure of the Catholic fundraising campaign.

Interviewed in an April 27 Catholic Register article, Archbishop Gérard Pettipas rejected the idea that the Catholic organizations had “used legal trickery to sidestep their obligations”, saying, “It isn’t accurate. [...] There was a cash contribution. There was in-kind payment. There was a best-efforts campaign. We did all those. There wasn’t any weaselling out.” (In a separate document dated April 21, Pettipas stated that the government had been “included in conversations dealing with the fundraising plan as designed by the fundraising firm”, and had been “informed on a yearly basis of the financial status of the fundraising campaign. ... The status of the campaign was well known so it is difficult to understand what it is represented that there was a misstep which would have taken place.”) The Catholic Register also interviewed Joanne Villemaire, senior vice president at Ketchum Philanthropy, the professional fundraising organization hired for the "Moving Forward Together" campaign. She said it was a "very tough project" and "significant effort" was put into it. However, according to the Register, "[w]hile [the campaign] did manage to raise money from Catholic dioceses, religious orders and associations, neither wealthy individuals nor corporations were ready to step up and become lead donors, said Villemaire." Pettipas stated that the Catholic entities dismissed Ketchum in 2013: "Not because they were doing a bad job. They were doing a terrific job, but it wasn’t working. We were spending more money doing administration and promotion than we were taking in. On a C$25-million campaign, you can expect to spend 10 per cent or C$2.5 million on all that. But we had already spent C$2 million and got almost nothing. ..." After the departure of Ketchum, the Catholic entities launched a nationwide pew collection, raising "just shy of C$1 million".

See also
Cultural genocide
First Nations
Idle No More
Racism in North America

Citations

External links
 Truth and Reconciliation Main Website
Indian Residential School Resolution Canada 
Remembering the Children Tour
 The schools Settlement Agreement 2007 at The Canadian Encyclopedia''

Truth and Reconciliation Commission of Canada
First Nations history
Residential schools in Canada
Human rights in Canada
First Nations education
Assimilation of indigenous peoples of North America
Truth and reconciliation reports